Honduran passports are issued to Honduran citizens to travel outside Honduras.

As of January 2019, Honduran citizens had visa-free or visa-on-arrival access to 137 countries and territories, ranking the Honduran passport 36th in terms of travel freedom (tied with Dominica and El Salvador) according to the Henley visa restrictions index.

In 2019, plans were confirmed to gradually begin issuing biometric passports to Honduran citizens beginning in the period between late 2019 and early 2020.

Honduras transitioned to a biometric passport in 2022.

See also
 Central America-4 passport
 Visa requirements for Honduran citizens
 Visa policy of Honduras

References

 Council regulation 539/2001
 Council regulation 1932/2006
 Council regulation 539/2001 consolidated version, 19.1.2007
 List of nationals who do need a visa to visit the UK
 List of countries whose passport holders do not require visas to enter Ireland

Honduras
Government of Honduras